Anna King may refer to:

Anna King (writer) (1948–2003), English author
Anna King (artist) (born 1984), Scottish landscape artist
Anna King (singer) (1937–2002), American soul and gospel singer
Anna Josepha King (1765–1844), wife of Philip Gidley King, Governor of New South Wales

See also
King Anna
Anna and the King, a 1999 biographical drama film
Ann King (disambiguation)
King (surname)